Jishnu Balakrishnan (born 26 May 1997) is an Indian professional footballer who plays as a defender for Kerala Premier League club Kerala United.

Career 
Jishnu piled his trade with NSS College, Manjeri and is a product of Malabar Special Police (MSP) Football Academy. The right-back, who can also be deployed in an attacking position, has represented Kerala football team in Santosh Trophy, Calicut University in the All-India Inter-University Football Championship. In 2017, he was signed by Kerala Blasters FC for three years contract. He was part of Kerala Blasters FC Reserves team. 

In 2018–19 season, he was sent on loan at Gokulam Kerala, He made his professional debut for the Gokulam Kerala FC against Indian Arrows on 21 December 2018, He started and played full match as Gokulam lost 0–1.

At 2021, he sign's for I-League new face Kenkre FC.

Career statistics

Club

References

1998 births
Living people
People from Malappuram
Indian footballers
Kerala Blasters FC Reserves and Academy players
Chennai City FC players  
I-League players
Association football defenders
Gokulam Kerala FC players
Indian Super League players
Footballers from Kerala
Kerala Blasters FC players